Alik Muzaiev (born 27 July 1978) is a Ukrainian wrestler. He competed in the men's freestyle 76 kg at the 2000 Summer Olympics.

References

External links
 

1978 births
Living people
Ukrainian male sport wrestlers
Olympic wrestlers of Ukraine
Wrestlers at the 2000 Summer Olympics
Place of birth missing (living people)